Fløya or Fløyfjellet is a mountain adjacent to the town of Svolvær in Vågan Municipality in Nordland county, Norway.

The mountain was historically called Svålen or Svolen and now that name usually refers to one of the lower peaks on the east side of the mountain.

References

Vågan
Mountains of Nordland